Asaphocrita spei is a moth in the family Blastobasidae that is endemic to Costa Rica.

References

Moths described in 2002
Endemic fauna of Costa Rica
spei